Administratively, Tajikistan is divided into:

 one autonomous region (viloyati mukhtor) 
 two regions (viloyatho ), sing. , viloyatو) 
 the Districts of Republican Subordination
 the capital city, Dushanbe.

{| class="wikitable sortable"
!No.!!Name!!Russian!!Tajik!!ISO!!Capital!!Area {km2)!!Pop (2000)!!Pop (2010)!!Pop (2019)
|-
|1||Sughd Region|| Sogdijskaya oblast' ||Viloyati Sughd||TJ-SU||Khujand
|align=right|25,400||align=right|1,871,979||align=right|2,233,550||align=right|2,658,400
|-
|2||Districts of Republican Subordination|| Rajoni respublikanskovo podchineniya||Nohiyahoi tobei jumhurī|| TJ-RA ||Dushanbe
|align=right|28,600||align=right|1,337,479||align=right|1,722,908||align=right|2,120,000
|-
|3||Khatlon Region|| Khatlonskaya oblast'''||Viloyati Khatlon||TJ-KT||Bokhtar
|align=right|24,800||align=right|2,150,136||align=right|2,677,251||align=right|3,274,900
|-
|4||Gorno-Badakhshan Autonomous Region1|| Gorno-Badakhshanskaya avtonomnaya oblast'||Viloyati Mukhtori Kūhistoni Badakhshon||TJ-GB||Khorugh
|align=right|64,200||align=right|206,004||align=right|205,949||align=right|226,900
|-
|–||Dushanbe|| Dushanbe||Dushanbe||TJ-DU||Dushanbe
|align=right|124.6||align=right|561,895||align=right|724,844||align=right|846,400
|}
1 The direct translation from Tajik is Kuhistoni Badakhshon Autonoumous Region, but the name translated from Russian is more commonly used in English.

Each region is divided into districts ( or ), which are further subdivided into jamoats'' (full name ), and then villages/settlements. Tajikistan has a total of 58 (not including 4 districts of the capital city Dushanbe) districts.

See also
Districts of Tajikistan
List of regions of Tajikistan by Human Development Index
ISO 3166-2:TJ
Yagnob Valley

References and footnotes

 
Subdivisions of Tajikistan
Tajikistan 1
Tajikistan 1
Regions, Tajikstan
Tajikistan
Tajikistan geography-related lists